Signaling and operation on the Washington Metro system involves train control, station identification, train signaling, signage, and train length.  As with any working railroad, communication between train operators, dispatchers, station personnel and passengers is critical.  Failures will result in delays, accidents, and even fatalities.  It is therefore important that a comprehensive signal system operated by a central authority be in place.  This gives individual train and station operators the information they need to safely and efficiently perform their tasks.

Train control 
Metro was designed to use an Automatic Train Control (ATC) system, which comprises three sub-systems. Automatic Train Protection (ATP) protects trains by separating them so as to avoid collision. Automatic Train Supervision (ATS) routes trains and assists in maintaining adherence to schedule. Together, these two sub-systems provide input to the train's cab signals and to a third sub-system, Automatic Train Operation (ATO), which can control the trains directly. Since a train collision in 2009 which was suspected to be caused by an ATC malfunction (although later was found to have not been caused by ATC), Metro did not use the ATC system following the accident until it was temporarily re-introduced on the Red Line in September 2014 as a test program. It has since been turned off again. In March 2023, Metro announced plans to re-automate the system by December of that year.

The Automatic Train Protection sub-system uses coded track circuit technology originally supplied by Rochester, New York-based General Railway Signal when the line was constructed in the 1970s. It is a life-critical system that provides a continuous stream of information to the train regarding the maximum safe speed via the running rails. Speed commands are designed to ensure trains maintain a safe stopping distance from any obstruction and do not exceed the speed limit for any segment of track. The system stops trains in advance of any other train traffic, and before stop signals at interlockings. The cab signalling system relies on track circuits to detect track occupancy, and thus send the appropriate speed code. Although the ATP system was designed to be fail-safe, the track circuit control equipment on which it relies has been prone to parasitic oscillations which can cause the system intermittently to fail to detect the presence of a train. This resulted in the 2009 collision, after which Metro began to operate all trains manually. In September 2014, Metro began reintroducing its computerized control system after taking a number of measures to avoid accidents similar to the 2009 accident.

The Automatic Train Supervision sub-system provides for headway management and proper interleaving of trains at junctions by speeding up or slowing down trains. The system works via a series of track mounted balises, which function as information beacons transmitting a speed code to the train as it passes overhead. Its designers intended its function to be non-vital, and for this reason, the design is not fail-safe. At no point can the ATC system override the maximum speed limit enforced by the cab signal system.

Automatic Train Operation controls trains so that, between stations, they will move at the speed specified by the automatic train protection and automatic train supervision sub-systems. All Metro trains are manned by train operators who work the doors, make station announcements, and supervise the train. The train operator also can control whether the train operates in automatic mode or manual mode. From November 17, 1995 until January 6, 1996, Metro management required its employees to use the automatic mode at all times. During the Blizzard of 1996, however, there was a collision on January 6 that occurred when the ATS system failed to pick up proper instructions from the wayside communication system during a snowstorm, and defaulted to the highest speed. This speed would have been safe during dry weather, but because of ice or snow, trains required additional stopping distance, which was not provided for by the ATC system. From the June 2009 collision until 2015, Metrorail operators operated the trains exclusively in manual mode; the ATC system was restored to the Red Line in 2015. The automatic train protection system still limits the maximum speed of every train that is in revenue service.

An automated announcement system is equipped on the 7000-series rolling stock and is planned to be added to the 6000-series rolling stock once rehabilitation of those train cars is complete.

Non-revenue tracks (storage tracks, tail tracks, yard tracks) are not equipped with ATC. Green signs with letters reading "START ATC" and "END ATC" mark the beginning and ending respectively of ATC territory.

Station identification 
The system's rail lines run on eleven lettered "routes". Within these routes, each station is also identified by a letter and number system based on the route letter and the station number in ascending order from the system's geographic center. This is known as the Remote Terminal Unit (RTU) number. The RTU number identifies the station and nearby track controlled by the station's wayside control room to Metro's Central Control.

Metro's lettered routes are as follows:
 C Route: Metro Center to  via  (Orange, Blue, Yellow and Silver)
 L Route: F&L Junction south of L'Enfant Plaza to C&L Junction north of  via Fenwick Bridge (Yellow)

There are no H, I, M, or O Routes. The originally-intended H Route ultimately became the present J Route, and "I" and "O" are not allowed to be used as route letters. The M Route would likely be assigned to a future route to Lincolnia, branching off from the C Route south of Pentagon station.

Signaling 

Fixed signals are only present at interlockings, and consist of three lamps: two red and one lunar. They show a red over red aspect for "stop and stay," a lunar (white) aspect for "proceed," and a flashing lunar aspect for "proceed on diverging route" (only present on newer interlockings; older interlockings are being updated with signals that show this aspect). Tracks are divided into block sections, which can only be occupied by one train at a time, a method to protect against collisions used by most railway systems worldwide, but there are generally no fixed signals to protect block sections (signals tend to be only at beginning/end of route and just before track switches). Virtual signal aspects are transmitted to the train by a cab signaling system and displayed to the operator in the cab, as well as transmitted to the ATC system. Entry into an occupied block is prevented by an automatic train protection system (ATP), which supervises both manual and ATC operation and stops the train well before it would enter an occupied block.

At switches entering into pocket tracks in a direction reverse to the normal operating direction, there is a "P Signal". The P Signal is a single lunar signal that displays the letter "P" and is found at the entrance to some but not all pocket tracks and other selected main line interlockings in the reverse direction of the normal flow of traffic. Below the P signal on the same post is a punch box to allow the train operator to manually set the switch to the diverting direction (reverse) when the P Signal is lit. The P signal is only lit when a train occupies the two track circuit approaching the P Signal and all possible routes into the interlocking are not occupied.

Similar signals are also in place on the Baltimore Metro SubwayLink, the PATCO Speedline, and the Miami Metrorail.

Signage 
Two trackside signs exist: The "S"-Sign is posted at revenue tracks and indicates to the operator that a station is ahead. It is located at a distance no greater than 1200 feet (365.75 m) before a station platform. The "TB"-Sign is posted to indicate to the operator that an eight-car train (the longest used in the system) is clear of an interlocking ("turnback") when the train front is flush with the sign, and that the train can turn back in the direction from which it came on the opposite track.

Train length 

When it first opened, Metro ran a mix of four- and six-car trains; however, there have not been any four-car trains used in the system (except for the money train) since the mid-2000s. The most common train length is eight cars due to the fact that the 7000 series railcars can only be operated this way. During peak hours, a mix of six- and eight-car trainsets are used, while during off-peak and weekend hours almost all trains are only six cars in length. In 2008, Metro began planning to acquire sufficient quantities of the new 7000-Series cars to run 100% eight-car trains. Metro also tested eight-car trains on the Yellow and Blue lines in preparation for increased service during the  2009 inauguration of Barack Obama.

However, by early 2010 riders began to lose faith in WMATA's "promise" to implement 100% eight-car trains. In December 2010 those fears were confirmed and Metro delayed the plans indefinitely.

, during peak hour service the Red Line runs 51% eight-car trains, the Orange Line runs 40%, and the Green Line runs 50%, while the Blue and Yellow Lines run only six-car trains, for a total of 43 of 129 trains running at full length, or 33%.

References

Signaling and operation